The Boguchany Dam is a large hydroelectric dam on the Angara River in Kodinsk, Krasnoyarsk Krai, Russia. It has an installed capacity of 2,997 MW. Construction of the power plant was completed when a ninth and final generator was brought online in January 2015.

History 

Preparatory works for the dam started in 1974, with construction of roads and a support point at the Koda seasonal settlement.  The design was performed by Hydroproject in 1976. 

Construction of the power station started in 1980 but was suspended in 1994 due to the lack of financing.  Work on the project resumed in 2005 when RAO UES (then owner of RusHydro) and Rusal agreed to develop the project jointly. Construction restarted in 2007.  The first turbine was dispatched in 2008.  
The dam began to fill its reservoir in May 2012. The filling required relocating various small settlements and flooded the valleys of several tributaries, including the Koda river.

By August 2012 the first two turbines were installed. They later became operational on 15 October 2012. The third generator began operations later the same month and the fourth was commissioned on 13 January 2013.

Description 
The dam was equipped with ship lock until 2010, later it was closed and its former location was included in concrete gravity section.

The power station consists of nine Francis turbines with a capacity of 333 MW each. It generates 17.6 TWh of electricity per year. Turbines are manufactured by Power Machines.  The power station is owned and operated by JSC Boguchanskaya GES, a joint venture of RusHydro and Rusal, who also built it. Energy from the plant is partly used by the Boguchany Aluminium Smelter.

Locale 

Main facilities of the dam are located on the Angara river, in Kodinsk gorge, 444 km upstream from the river mouth, and are surrounded by taiga. The Angara flows in latitudinal direction here, cutting through Cambrian and Ordovician sedimentary massif interspersed with diabase intrusions. The valley's width barely exceeds 1 mile here, with rocky asymmetric bluffs overhanging the riverstream. The region is potentially seismic, with up to 7 degrees MSK-64 earthquake chance (1 in 5000 years possible recurrence).

As it reaches the dam, The Angara's river basin area accounts for 831,000 km3. The river's supply is greatly dependent on the Lake Baikal and superincumbent reservoirs of Irkutsk, Bratsk and Ust-Ilimsk dams. The Angara's discharge amounts to 16,210 m³/s.

The climatic conditions in the vicinity may be described as continental. Summers are short and warm, whilst winters are prolonged and severe. Annual average temperature ranges between −2,6 to −4,3 °С, with the average July high of +18,5 °С and the average January low of −27,4 °С.

Navigation conditions improvement 
In 2012, the present design of all dams on the Angara river doesn't allow passage of any ships. Additionally the river was not navigable within the section between Boguchany Dam and Ust-Ilimsk Dam. It will flood the last section of the Angara channel, which was inaccessible for safe navigation because of shallow rapids in the river.

The downstream part of the river has a shallow channel too and stays unavailable for large seaworthy ships. According to various sources related to this subject, there are plans to build additional dams in the lower part of Angara river or, according to original soviet plans, to build one large hydro power plant in Yenisei River below its join with Angara. The latter variant presumes construction of the largest hydro power plant in Russia with an annual production of over 40 TWh.

Gallery

See also

 List of power stations in Russia
 Boguchany Aluminium Smelter

References

External links 

 
 Boguchany Dam Photostory

Hydroelectric power stations in Russia
Dams completed in 2012
Dams on the Angara River